Marija "Muska" Babitzin (born 1952) is a Finnish singer.

Muska may also refer to:

People
 Muska, a name appearing in Assyrian inscriptions identified as Meshech, one of the sons of Japheth, son of Noah
 Chad Muska (born 1977), American professional skateboarder

Places
Muska, the Hungarian name for Muşca village, Lupșa Commune, Alba County, Romania
 Muska, the Slavic toponym for Kudunia

Film and literature
 Muška voda, a 1968 Yugoslavian film
 Muska ("The Amulet"), a 1996 Turkish novel by author Sadık Yemni
 , a 2014 Turkish film by Özkan Çelik based on this novel

Other
 Muska, a small triangular amulet in Turkish folklore, containing verses from the Koran or other prayers traditionally wrapped in leather, believed to protect from harm or give luck
 a Kilim motif (amulet)
 any object with the same shape, e.g. muska böreği, a samosa-like börek pastry in a triangular shape
 muṣká, Sanskrit word meaning "testicle", English Musk, a substance with a penetrating odor obtained from a gland of the male musk deer